Anthony J. Resta is a Canadian record producer and musician. A multi-instrumentalist, he is a known for his use of vintage audio equipment. He has earned twelve RIAA certified gold and multi-platinum awards and has been featured in many articles for his innovative recording techniques. Some of his past clients have included Duran Duran, Elton John, Needtobreathe, Collective Soul, Guster, Megadeth, Perry Farrell, Nuno Bettencourt, Andrea Surova, Lucia Moniz, Dale Bozzio, TV Mania, Shawn Mullins, Del Marquis of Scissor Sisters, Green River Ordinance, Sarah Evans, The Cinnamon Fuzz, New Collisions, Blondie, Boys Don't Cry, and The Making Of The Making Of.

After signing on with Kathy Anaya, at that time with Lippman Entertainment in Los Angeles, in 1994, he began attracting more high-profile clients. 

His first solo album called Demos of Saturn, originally released in the mid-1990s under the name Ajax Ray-O-Vaque, quickly sold out its initial production run and was only intermittently available on eBay until its release on iTunes in 2009.

Resta received his 12th RIAA Gold and Platinum certification for his programming and production work in the soundtrack of the successful Twilight films.

At the Indie Short Fest, Los Angeles International Film Festival, August 2022, Resta received the award, Best Original Score for the indie short film “The Chair.”

Current career
Resta spent years working with engineer Karyadi Sutedja at studio Bopnique Musique in an old textile mill just west of  Boston. The  studio is full of vintage recording equipment from the 1950s, 1960s, and 1970s, as well as high end modern recording gear. All of the vintage gear (and Karyadi) have been moved to Paramount Studios in Los Angeles, where Resta continues to revolutionize recording in a nicer climate.

Discography

Awards

RIAA

Film/Media

2015 Hollywood Music in Media Awards, Music Genre winner in the Producer/Production category

References

Notes

Sources
"berklee alumni magazine feature"
Mix magazine. the Indie Short Fest, Los Angeles International Film Festival, August 2022, Resta received the award, Best Original Score for the indie short film “The Chair.” eb/20110629141318/http://mixonline.com/mixline/resta-crowleyandtripp-mics-071706/ Anthony Resta Uses Crowley and Tripp Ribbon Mics for Perry Farrell Release
EQ magazine. Satellite Party, Richard Buskin
"Hitting The Big Time In A Small Town". Boston Globe, December 27, 2002, by Steve Morse, Globe Staff

External links
 PURE SONIC ALCHEMY website
 Studio Secrets A to Z website
 IMDb Anthony J. Resta page
 Tremble band website
 La Machine De Rêve band website
 Electric Lecture band website
 ELECTRONS official website
 Anthony Resta Interview NAMM Oral History Library (2018)

American record producers
Living people
Year of birth missing (living people)